"Why" is the debut solo single of Scottish singer-songwriter Annie Lennox, released on 16 March 1992. It was taken from her debut solo album, Diva (1992), and reached number five in the United Kingdom. In the United States, "Why" peaked at number 34 on the Billboard Hot 100 and number six on the Adult Contemporary chart. It was also a big hit internationally, reaching number one in Italy and peaking within the top 10 in Belgium, Canada, Ireland and five other countries. Its music video was directed by Sophie Muller. Stereogum ranked "Why" number one in their list of the 10 best Annie Lennox songs in 2015.

Chart performance
"Why" was successful on the charts in several countries, peaking at number one in Italy. In Europe, it reached the top 10 in Belgium, Denmark, Ireland, the Netherlands, Norway, Sweden, Switzerland, and the United Kingdom, as well as on the Eurochart Hot 100, where it peaked at number three. In the UK, the single reached number five in its third week at the UK Singles Chart, on 5 April 1992. Additionally, it was a top-20 hit in Austria, Germany and Spain. 

Outside Europe, "Why" reached number seven on the RPM Top Singles chart in Canada, number 15 in New Zealand, number 17 in Australia, and number 34 on the Billboard Hot 100 in the United States. But on the Billboard Adult Contemporary, it was an even bigger hit, peaking at number six.

Critical reception
Jennifer Bowles from Associated Press described the song as an "emotional" and "hypnotizing ballad". Larry Flick from Billboard called it a "soft-yet-vivid ballad that beautifully showcases the rich and distinctive tone of her voice". He noted the "sophisticated nature of track [that] will strain at (and should ultimately knock down) the tight boundaries of top 40 radio." Clark and DeVancy from Cashbox viewed it as a "soulful ballad", that "is stirring attention, which is, of course, Annie's forte." Keith Wallace from Columbia Daily Spectator said that "Why" "wants to be a soulful ballad, but it's so drippy and goofy that it doesn't come anywhere close." Stephanie Zacharek from Entertainment Weekly noted how "languorously [Lennox] stretches that word across several measures as if she were unfurling a length of satin." Dave Sholin from the Gavin Report stated that the "haunting" song is "a testament to her singing and writing prowess." Another editor, Kent Zimmerman, called it "spiritually ultrasonic, breathtakingly sophisticated, lyrically telling and congruently adult in texture and tempo." 

A reviewer from Music & Media commented that the singer "confidently goes AC on her first solo effort" and it is "gently moving and highly polished. She could hardly move farther away from the stirring rock of Eurythmics." Nick Griffiths from Select said that it is "the sort of tasteful soulful ballady thing you 'd probably expect of her by now, and when the tide of tasteful soulful balladiness swamps her halfway through it's no surprise either." Slant Magazines Eric Henderson wrote that "Why" is "hardly the sort of melodramatic setting we'd imagine from an album whose very name evokes histrionic pretense. But Annie Lennox isn't and has never been a representative pop diva. Her body is lanky and angular instead of curvaceously plush. Her exaggerated facial features (capped off with a most spectacular set of cheekbones that she wisely never allowed her hair to grow long enough to cover) are matched in androgen-fabulousness only by her tremulously guttural alto." Harry Dean from Smash Hits complimented the song as a "glistening beauty".

Retrospective response
In an 2009 retrospective review, Mike Ragogna from HuffPost wrote that Lennox' vocal approach "evokes" Sting and Paul Simon and added "she declares, "This is the book I never read, these are the words I never said, this is the path I'll never tread", then went on to say, "These are the dreams I'll dream instead", making this her sideways stab at creating her own "My Way" (as the artist points out in the notes [of her 2009 collection])." 

Stereogum ranked "Why" number one in their list of the 10 best Annie Lennox songs in 2015. They wrote, "And while the album maybe didn't live up to those hopes, Divas first single remains an enduring classic. A bold enough move to have your first single be a torch ballad of regret, but this one is a weeper for the ages. It's a musical version of the Kübler-Ross model with Lennox hitting the grief stage as she welcomes her ex-lover "down to the water's edge" to "cast away those doubts", spilling out "the contents of her head" during the depression stage, and then crumpling to the floor repeating the phrase, "You don't know how I feel" as acceptance sets in. This was the song that you put on repeat to cope with that awful breakup because in every syllable she sings, you can hear that Lennox has been there too and feels just as bad as you do."

Music video
The accompanying music video for the song was directed by British director Sophie Muller and was filmed in Venice, Italy during the shoot for the Diva album cover. The video shows Lennox sitting in front of a vanity mirror staring and marveling at herself before slowly putting on makeup. By the middle of the video, Lennox is fully made up and in the outfit she wears on the Diva album cover. The rest of the video consists of shots of Lennox posing for the cameras along with in-between shots of her singing the song. The video won Lennox an award for Best Female Video at the 1992 MTV Video Music Awards. It was later published on YouTube in October 2009 and by March 2022 the video had received more than 61.7 million views.

Track listings
7-inch single

CD maxi

Charts

Weekly charts

Year-end charts

Certifications

DJ Sammy version

In 2005 Spanish producer DJ Sammy covered "Why" with vocals from German singer Britta Medeiros. "Why" is the second single from the album The Rise. The music video features DJ Sammy in a room with a mixboard that he uses to create three holographic women that sing the song.

Formats and track listings
US CD single
 "Why"  – 4:00
 "Why"  – 4:25
 "Why"  – 6:44
 "Why"  – 5:55
 "Why"  – 6:17
 "Why"  – 7:10
 "Why"  – 7:58
 "Why"  – 7:58
 "Why"  – 9:21

Germany CD single
 "Why" 
 "Why" 
 "Why" 
 "Cheba"

Australia CD single
 "Why" 
 "Why" 
 "Why" 
 "Why" 

UK CD single
 "Why"  – 3:28
 "Why"  – 6:43
 "Why"  – 6:19
 "Why"  – 5:55
 "Why"  – 8:46
 "Why" music video

Charts

References

1992 songs
1992 debut singles
2005 singles
Annie Lennox songs
DJ Sammy songs
MTV Video Music Award for Best Female Video
Songs written by Annie Lennox
Song recordings produced by Stephen Lipson
Number-one singles in Italy
Arista Records singles
1990s ballads
Pop ballads
Soul ballads